KEQB (97.7 FM) is an American radio station licensed to serve Coburg, Oregon, United States.  The station, which began broadcasting in 1992, is owned by John and Renate Tilson, through licensee McKenzie River Broadcasting Company, Inc.

Programming
KEQB broadcasts a regional Mexican format to Coburg, Oregon, and the Eugene-Springfield area.

History
This station received its original construction permit from the Federal Communications Commission on April 18, 1991.  The new station was assigned the KSHL call sign by the FCC on May 31, 1991.  KSHL received its license to cover from the FCC on March 2, 1993. On Sept. 15, 2015, an Application was filed with the FCC to assign the station license to McKenzie River Broadcasting Company, Inc. The assignment to McKenzie River Broadcasting was consummated on January 6, 2016, at a purchase price of $650,000.

On February 2, 2016, the station changed its call sign from KSHL to KEQB. On February 18, 2016 KEQB began transmitting from its new Coburg facilities (serving the Eugene area) at 97.7 FM with a regional Mexican format, branded as "La Que Buena 97.7".

Construction permit
This move would allow the station to serve the larger Eugene, Oregon, market, and at the same time allowing KNRQ (at 97.9) to relocate to the Portland area. The FCC accepted this application for filing on April 14, 2008, but it took until March 10, 2016 for the license to be issued.

Previous logo

References

External links

EQB
Radio stations established in 1993
Lane County, Oregon
1993 establishments in Oregon